The 2020–21 Iona Gaels men's basketball team represented Iona College in the 2020–21 NCAA Division I men's basketball season. The Gaels, led by first-year head coach Rick Pitino, played their home games at the Hynes Athletic Center in New Rochelle, New York as members of the Metro Atlantic Athletic Conference. In a season limited due to the ongoing COVID-19 pandemic, they finished the season 12–6, 6–3 in MAAC play to finish in a tie for ninth place. As the No. 9 seed in the MAAC tournament, they defeated Quinnipiac, Siena, and Niagara to advance to the tournament championship game. They defeated Fairfield to win the tournament championship and earned the conference's automatic bid to the NCAA tournament. They received a No. 15 seed in the East region, and lost in the First round to No. 2 seed Alabama 55–68.

The Gaels marked the fifth team Pitino had taken to the NCAA Tournament, tying him with Lon Kruger and Tubby Smith, for the record for most teams taken to the tournament.

Previous season
The Gaels finished the 2019–20 season 12–17, 9–11 in MAAC play to finish in a tie for sixth place. As the No. 7 seed in the MAAC tournament, they defeated Canisius, before losing to Saint Peter's in the quarterfinals.

Following the season, head coach Tim Cluess stepped down as head coach of the Gaels due to health concerns. A day later, the school named Hall of Fame coach Rick Pitino the Gaels' new head coach.

Roster

Schedule and results
On February 22, 2021, the Iona men's basketball team was placed on another COVID-19 pause due to a player testing positive for the virus the previous day. The school effectively canceled their remaining five conference games, but participated in the MAAC Tournament.
|-
!colspan=12 style=| Regular season

|-
!colspan=12 style=| MAAC tournament
|-

|-
!colspan=12 style=| NCAA tournament
|-

|-

Source

References

Iona Gaels men's basketball seasons
Iona Gaels
Iona Gaels men's basketball
Iona Gaels men's basketball
Iona